Tidar (also Romanized as Tīdār; also known as Tūtdār and Tūdār) is a village in Heshmatabad Rural District, in the Central District of Dorud County, Lorestan Province, Iran. At the 2006 census, its population was 63, in 16 families.

References 

Towns and villages in Dorud County